Altenburger Land II is an electoral constituency (German: Wahlkreis) represented in the Landtag of Thuringia. It elects one member via first-past-the-post voting. Under the current constituency numbering system, it is designated as constituency 44. It covers the eastern part of Altenburger Land.

Altenburger Land II was created for the 1994 state election. Originally named Altenburg II, it was renamed after the 1994 election. Since 2014, it has been represented by Christoph Zippel of the Christian Democratic Union (CDU).

Geography
As of the 2019 state election, Altenburger Land II covers the eastern part of Altenburger Land, specifically the municipalities of Altenburg, Fockendorf, Gerstenberg, Göpfersdorf, Haselbach, Langenleuba-Niederhain, Nobitz, Treben, and Windischleuba.

Members
The constituency has been held by the Christian Democratic Union since its creation in 1994. Its first representative was Andreas Sonntag, who served from 1994 to 2004, followed by Christian Gumprecht (2004–2014) and Christoph Zippel (2014–present).

Election results

2019 election

2014 election

2009 election

2004 election

1999 election

1994 election

References

Electoral districts in Thuringia
1994 establishments in Germany
Altenburger Land
Constituencies established in 1994